The F-22 Demonstration and Heritage Flight Team is a United States Air Force flight demonstration team stationed at the home of Air Combat Command at Langley AFB in Hampton, Virginia. The team flies the USAF's Lockheed Martin F-22 Raptor at airshows around the globe, performing air maneuvers that demonstrate the supermaneuverability of the F-22. These demonstrations include the power loop, split, and tail slide, as well as a high speed pass and dedication pass. These maneuvers are based on those designed for combat operations, but are performed at much lower altitudes than most pilots are certified to fly at. The US Air Force approved the demonstration in 2007, replacing Air Combat Command's F-15C demonstration team.

References

External links
 Team's official website
 Team's Air Force Website

Squadrons of the United States Air Force